"Ubangi Stomp" is an American rockabilly song. Written by Charles Underwood and first released on record by Warren Smith in 1956, the song did not chart, but went on to become a rockabilly standard, covered by many artists. "Ubangi Stomp" – usually Smith's recording – appears on many compilation albums, including The Sun Records Collection and The Best of Bob Dylan's Theme Time Radio Hour.

"Ubangi Stomp" is a straightforward uptempo rock and roll song; the lyrics, of no great literary depth ("Ubangi stomp ubangi style / When the beat just drives a cool cat wild"), tell in first person the story of a sailor who goes to Africa ("I rocked through Africa and... Seen them cats doin' the Ubangi stomp") and, enamored of the local music and dance, jumps ship to go native ("Then the captain said son, we gotta go / I said that's alright, you go right ahead / I'm gonna Ubangi-stomp 'till I roll over dead"). Some mixing of cultural stereotypes is seen when supposed Native American terms ("heap big", tom-tom) are mixed into the ostensibly African setting.

The Ubangi Stomp Festival, an annual international exposition of America roots and rockabilly music, takes its name from the song, as does the Ubangi Stomp Club, a Dublin organization that organizes and promotes roots concerts and gigs.

Saxophonist Earl Bostic released an instrumental piece titled "Ubangi Stomp" in 1954, but this has no relation to Underwood's song beyond the title.

Notable recordings
Warren Smith (single) (1956, Sun #250)
Jerry Lee Lewis, on the album Jerry Lee Lewis (1958, Sun)
The Trashmen (single) (1965, Argo #5516)
Carl Mann, on the album The Sun Story, Volume 6: Carl Mann (1977)
Alice Cooper, on the album Lace and Whiskey (1977, Warner Bros.)
John Prine, on the album Pink Cadillac (1979, Asylum)
The Cichlids on the album Be True To Your School (1980, TK)
The Stray Cats, on the album Stray Cats (1981, Arista)
Gary Young (single) (1981)
The Honeymoon Killers, on the album The Honeymoon Killers from Mars (1984, Fur)
The Busters (single) (1996)
Danny Gatton and Robert Gordon, on the live album The Humbler (recorded 1981, released 1996, NRG) 
Eddie Hinton, on the album Hard Luck Guy (1999, Capricorn)

The song has been covered by many other artists, including the Juke Joints (on their album 20 years), the Top Cats (on their album Full Throttle Rockabilly), The Slippers (on their album Ubangi Stomp), The Sundowners (on the B-side of their 1959 single "Snake Eyed Woman"), The Velaires (on the B-side of their 1961 single "It's Almost Tomorrow"),  Bobby Taylor (on the B-side of his 1962 single "Seven Steps to an Angel"), and others. Rory Storm and the Hurricanes recorded the song at Abbey Road Studios in 1964, but this version was never released.

Foghat recorded a version during the sessions for their first album, Foghat, but the song was not included on the album. It was included on their 1992 compilation Best of Foghat Volume 2 and on their The Definitive Rock Collection in 2006.

References

Notes

Rockabilly songs
1956 singles
Stray Cats songs
Jerry Lee Lewis songs
Alice Cooper songs
John Prine songs
The Trashmen songs
1956 songs
Songs about Africa